Apoy sa Lupang Hinirang is a 1990 Philippine political drama action film directed by . The film stars Jestoni Alarcon, Rina Reyes and Bernard Bonnin.

Cast
 Jestoni Alarcon as Berting
 Rina Reyes as Elena
 Bernard Bonnin as Don Franco
 Vanessa Escano
 Roselle Agana
 Toby Alejar
 Turko Cervantes
 Cris Daluz
 Joseph de Cordova
 Renato del Prado
 Patrick dela Rosa
 Flora Gasser
 Robert Miller

References

External links

1990 films
1990 action films
Filipino-language films
Philippine action films
Moviestars Production films
Films directed by Mauro Gia Samonte